Kathan Brown (born 1935) is an American master printmaker, writer, lecturer, and entrepreneur. In 1962, Brown founded Crown Point Press, a fine art print shop specializing in etching, and has owned and directed the shop since then. Crown Point Press is widely credited with sparking the revival of etching as a viable art medium. Some of the most important artists of our time, including John Cage, Chuck Close, Anish Kapoor, Ed Ruscha, Kiki Smith and Pat Steir, have worked there.

Early life and education
Brown was born in New York City and grew up in Daytona Beach, Florida.  She received a B.A. from Antioch College and an M.F.A. from the California College of Arts and Crafts. In addition, she holds Honorary Doctorate degrees from California College of the Arts (CCA) and the San Francisco Art Institute.

Career
In 1956, Brown left Antioch College in Ohio for one year to attend the Central School of Arts and Crafts in London.  There, she began to study etching. After graduating from Antioch College in 1958, Brown returned to the Central School for another year to fine-tune her technique. In addition, she participated in the Print Workshop at 28 Charlotte Street, run by Birgit Skiöld.

In the summer of 1959, while on a holiday trip to Edinburgh, Brown noticed an old etching press in the backyard of her rooming house. The landlady offered the press to Brown, saying it had been there since World War II.   With the etching press in tow, Brown booked passage on a freighter going to San Francisco from Glasgow via the Panama Canal.

In 1962, Brown started Crown Point Press in a storefront space in Richmond, California. The following year she bought a house in Berkeley and ran the printmaking workshop out of her basement. In 1965, Brown began publishing the etching portfolios of Richard Diebenkorn and Wayne Thiebaud.  The Press moved into a vacant hat factory on San Pablo Avenue in Oakland in 1971 and then to Folsom Street in San Francisco in 1986.  Unfortunately, the Folsom Street space was lost in the Loma Prieta earthquake of 1989.  In 1990, Crown Point moved to 20 Hawthorne Street in San Francisco where it resides today.

In recent years, Brown has shifted much of her focus to writing and left the day-to-day operations of the press to director Valerie Wade who is a partner in the business.  In 2006, Crown Point began publishing a series of books about printmaking, the Magical Secrets series.  Brown wrote the first book in the series, Magical Secrets about Thinking Creatively: The Art of Etching and the Truth of Life, which highlights various creative processes artists have embraced while working in the Crown Point studio. Art on Paper magazine reviewed Magical Secrets about Thinking Creatively saying, “Brown combines printmaking, art history, memoir and how-to inspirational literature to address the creative process.  She’s wise, forthcoming and down-to-earth”.  In 2004, Brown wrote The North Pole, a book detailing her trip to the North Pole through photographs and interviews with travelers, scientists, and a polar archivist.  Brown is also the author of a monthly video segment, The Three Minute Egg, where she discusses the creative process.

Over the years, Crown Point’s roster has grown to include over 100 artists from all around the world.  Crown Point’s archives have been held at the Fine Arts Museums of San Francisco since 1991.  A smaller archive is owned by the National Gallery of Art, Washington, D.C.  Crown Point Press celebrated its twenty-fifth anniversary with an exhibition at the Museum of Modern Art in New York, and its thirty-fifth with a retrospective jointly organized by and shown at the National Gallery of Art, Washington, D.C. and the Fine Arts Museum of San Francisco at the California Palace of the Legion of Honor.  Today, Crown Point Press publishes the work of five artists a year, hosts printmaking workshops and publishes a series of books about printmaking.  The Press will be fifty years old in 2012.

Personal life

Brown married Jeryl Parker in 1960 and had a son, Kevin Powis Parker, in 1961. Parker and Brown amicably separated in 1963 and later divorced.

In 1983, she married conceptual artist Tom Marioni. They make their home in San Francisco.

Published work

Books by Brown 

 
 
 Why Draw a Live Model? Crown Point Press, 1997

Contribution by Brown 

Changing Art: A Chronicle Centered on John Cage, in Tri-Quarterly 54, Spring 1982. Reprinted in A John Cage Reader, Wesleyan University Press, 1983
The Cambridge Companion to John Cage, (contributor), ed. David Nicholls, Cambridge University Press, 2002
The Uncertainty Principle, The Guardian (UK), March 8, 2002
 Edited, and with an appendix on printing by Kathan Brown
 Edited, and with an appendix on printing by Kathan Brown

Honors and awards

1965 – Award for Etching, California Society of Etchers
1983 – Arts Commission, City of San Francisco, Award of Honor
1985 – Honorary Doctorate of Fine Arts, California College of Arts and Crafts
1990 – Honorary Doctorate of Fine Arts, San Francisco Art Institute
1993 – Outstanding Achievement Award, ArtTable, Inc., Northern California Chapter
1997 – Cyril Award for Business Excellence, San Francisco Chamber of Commerce, San Francisco, California

References

External links
Oral history interview with Kathan Brown, 2017 December 15-18 from Archives of American Art, Smithsonian Institution
SFMOMA 75th Anniversary Oral History Project, Kathan Brown, Founder, Crown Point Press from 2007, from Regional Oral History Office at the Bancroft Library
Crown Point Press website

1935 births
Living people
American printmakers
American women writers
Antioch College alumni
Artists from the San Francisco Bay Area
American women printmakers
21st-century American women artists